Beniamino Segre (16 February 1903 – 2 October 1977) was an Italian mathematician who is remembered today as a major contributor to algebraic geometry and one of the founders of finite geometry.

Life and career
He was born and studied in Turin. Corrado Segre, his uncle, also served as his doctoral advisor.

Among his main contributions to algebraic geometry are studies of birational invariants of algebraic varieties, singularities and algebraic surfaces.  His work was in the style of the old Italian School, although he also appreciated the greater rigour of modern algebraic geometry.

Segre was a pioneer in finite geometry, in particular projective geometry based on vector spaces over a finite field. In a well-known paper  he proved the following theorem: In a Desarguesian plane of odd order, the ovals are exactly the irreducible conics. In 1959 he authored a survey "Le geometrie di Galois" on Galois geometry. According to J. W. P. Hirschfeld, it "gave a comprehensive list of results and methods, and is to my mind the seminal paper in the subject."

Some critics felt that his work was no longer geometry, but today it is recognized as a separate sub-discipline: finite geometry or combinatorial geometry. According to Hirschfeld, "He published the most as well as the deepest papers in the subject. His enormous knowledge of classical algebraic geometry enabled him to identify those results which could be applied to finite spaces. His theorem on the characterization of conics (Segre's theorem) not only stimulated a great deal of research but also made many mathematicians realize that finite spaces were worth studying."

In 1938 he lost his professorship at the University of Bologna, as a result of the anti-Jewish laws enacted under Benito Mussolini's government. He spent the next 8 years in Great Britain (mostly at the University of Manchester), then returned to Italy to resume his academic career.

Selected publications
.

. The second volume was never published: however an updated and largely expanded English edition was published as: .
.
.

.
 
.

.

Notes

References
.
.
.

Sernesi, Edoardo: "Beniamino Segre (Torino 1903-Frascati 1977)" (incl. extensive bibliography)

External links

1903 births
1977 deaths
20th-century Italian Jews
Scientists from Turin
20th-century Italian mathematicians
Italian algebraic geometers
Algebraic geometers
Members of the Lincean Academy
Academic staff of the University of Bologna
Italian expatriates in the United Kingdom